Coequosa triangularis, the double-headed hawk moth, is a moth of the family Sphingidae.

Distribution 
It is known from the Australian states of New South Wales and Queensland.

Description 
The species was first described by Edward Donovan in 1805. 
The wingspan is about 130 mm, making it Australia's largest hawk moth. Adults are yellow and brown with broad wavy markings.

Biology 
The larvae feed on Banksia ericifolia, Grevillea robusta, Hakea dactyloides, Macadamia integrifolia, Persoonia levis and Stenocarpus sinuatus. The head is an orange conical structure, but on its tail are two large raised black knobs. These look like a pair of large eyes, so that an observer or predator finds it difficult to determine which end is the head. The body is green or yellow, often with yellow diagonal stripes and sometimes with purplish lateral markings. It is covered in soft short pale spines. Full-grown larvae are about 100 mm long.

References

Smerinthini
Moths described in 1805